Alicia Rodis is an American intimacy coordinator, director and actor.

Career
Rodis grew up in Cleveland, Ohio, and acted in regional and classical theatre. Growing up, Alicia was often cast in more adult roles. She was aged 15 when she had an on-stage kiss, and faked an orgasm aged 18. She had mixed experiences of adult scenes, with some causing mental distress later.

She moved to New York City in 2008, and became involved with the New York Shakespeare Exchange, becoming the fight director for several productions, and directing a Shakespeare-themed pub crawl in the city. She has also worked with the Yale School of Drama and the Juilliard School. She worked as intimacy coordinator on Season 2 of HBO's The Deuce and was the first such hire by a mainstream television network; demand for intimacy coordinators, who are tasked to ensure the well-being of actors performing in sex scenes or other intimate sequences, rose following the emergence of the Me Too movement in 2017. She was recommended for the role based on her reputation, and her help was described as "a successful, positive, experience".

Intimacy Directors International
Rodis is a founding member of Intimacy Directors International, an organization working towards developing standards of safety and performance for intimacy in film and on stage. Along with her co-founders, Tonia Sina and Siobhan Richardson, she has witnessed inappropriate behavior on set or mishandling during scenes involving close intimacy. Her role is to watch the scenes closely, making notes, and making sure actors are comfortable with the work required, and that nobody is physically or mentally harmed. Rodis has said that there is an increased demand for this type of work. In early 2020, the US actors' union SAG-AFTRA publicized a policy mandating the inclusion of intimacy coordinators.

In 2018, the group performed an exhibition, #MeToo Shakespeare, explaining the importance of Intimacy Choreography.

References

External links
 Instagram page of Rodis
 Facebook page of Rodis

Year of birth missing (living people)
American theatre directors
Women theatre directors
21st-century American actresses
People from Cleveland
Living people